The 1959–60 Iraq Central FA First Division Cup was the 12th season of the Iraq Central FA League (the top division of football in Baghdad and its neighbouring cities from 1948 to 1973). It was played as a double-elimination tournament. Al-Athori beat Al-Quwa Al-Jawiya 3–0 in the final on 6 May 1960 to win their first title.

Final positions

First round

Second round

Winners bracket

Losers bracket

Al-Filiya eliminated

Al-Adhamiya eliminated

Third round

Winners bracket

The match was ended five minutes early after two Amanat Al-Asima players walked off the field in protest at a refereeing decision

Losers bracket

Al-Numan eliminated

Maslahat Naqil Al-Rukab eliminated

Al-Kuliya Al-Askariya eliminated

Fourth round

Losers bracket

Al-Liwa Al-Thamin eliminated

Al-Ghazl wal-Naseej eliminated

Al-Sikak Al-Hadeed eliminated

Semi-finals

Winners bracket

Losers bracket

Amanat Al-Asima eliminated

Montakhab Al-Shorta eliminated

Final

Bracket

References

External links
 Iraqi Football Website

Iraq Central FA League seasons
Iraq
1959 in Iraqi sport
1960 in Iraqi sport